Renate Veronica Cerljen (born March 26, 1988 in Staffanstorp, Sweden) is the first ever winner of the Miss Universe Sweden pageant which she won on June 6, 2009. Cerljen represented Sweden at the Miss Universe 2009 pageant on the Bahamas on August 23, 2009 and placed in the Top 15. Renate was the first non-winner of the Miss Sweden pageant since 1952 to represent Sweden at Miss Universe since Miss Sweden lost its rights to crown a contestant for Miss Universe earlier in 2009.  Cerljen was also the first delegate from Sweden at the international final since 2006 when Josephine Alhanko placed in the Top 20. Miss Universe 1984 winner Yvonne Ryding was among the judges in the final which crowned Cerljen as winner. By making the Top 15 Cerljen became Sweden's 29th semifinalist at the Miss Universe pageant overall. In May 2010 Cerljen placed fifth in the Miss Beauty of the World pageant in China. Cerljen was a judge at the Miss Sinergy competition for breast cancer in 2009 as well as 2010 which is an annual pageant made by the Sinergy group, held at the House of Sweden in Washington DC, United States.

Cerljen represented Sweden in Miss Earth 2011 which took place in Manila, Philippines on December 3. She was chosen internally by the organization as Miss Earth Sweden 2011. In the final she made the Top 16.

Cerljen has previously been an elite gymnast but had to quit in 2005 because of an injury during training.

In April 2011 Renate Cerljen toured India with the children's’ charity, “Healthy Kids Happy Kids”. Founded by Satish Sikha They provided food, clothing and medical treatment to thousands of children in need.

References

External links
Official website

1988 births
Living people
People from Staffanstorp Municipality
Miss Earth 2011 contestants
Miss Universe 2009 contestants
Swedish beauty pageant winners